Cannabis and Cannabinoid Research is a quarterly peer-reviewed academic journal published by Mary Ann Liebert since 2016 and "dedicated to the scientific, medical, and psychosocial exploration of clinical cannabis, cannabinoids, and the biochemical mechanisms of endocannabinoids". The editor-in-chief is Daniele Piomelli (University of California, Irvine). It is the official journal of the Association of Cannabis Specialists, the International Association for Cannabinoid Medicines, and the International Cannabinoid Research Society.

References

External links

Mary Ann Liebert academic journals
Publications established in 2016
Quarterly journals
Pharmacology journals
English-language journals
Medicinal use of cannabis